Morgantown Historic District is a national historic district located at Morgantown, Morgan County, Indiana.  The district encompasses 34 contributing buildings in the central business district and surrounding residential sections of Morgantown.  It developed between about 1840 and 1956, and includes notable examples of Greek Revival, Italianate, Late Gothic Revival, Queen Anne, and Bungalow/American Craftsman style architecture.  Notable buildings include the Farmer's Cooperative Store / Blanche Crawford Building, First National Bank (1905), Obenshain Hotel (1860), Morgantown Town Hall (1900), Griffitt-Murphy House and Livery Bank (1895), Parkhurst House (1865), Redman's Lodge (1908), Wisby Hotel (1918), Telephone Exchange (1906), and Morgantown Methodist Episcopal Church complex (1923).

It was listed on the National Register of Historic Places in 2006.

References

Historic districts on the National Register of Historic Places in Indiana
Italianate architecture in Indiana
Greek Revival architecture in Indiana
Gothic Revival architecture in Indiana
Queen Anne architecture in Indiana
Bungalow architecture in Indiana
Historic districts in Morgan County, Indiana
National Register of Historic Places in Morgan County, Indiana